A Man from the Boulevard des Capucines is a Red Western comedy film of 1987 (Mosfilm production), with nods to silent film and the transforming power of celluloid.

This film is particularly unusual in Soviet cinema for two reasons: first, it was directed by one of the few female Soviet directors of any stature, Alla Surikova, and second it was a rare post-modernist Soviet outing.

The film had the highest ratings in the Soviet Union in 1987, with 60 million viewers.

Plot

Mr. John First (Johnny) is a cinematographer traveling to Santa Carolina when he is stopped by a band of robbers, headed by Black Jack. Johnny is the only one who does not pull out a gun and fight during the midst of the action and is thus questioned by Black Jack as to why. He then takes the book which Johnny is so fervently looking through and ends up mistaking it for a Bible, until he notices that it contains several blank pages. Johnny explains that it is a book of World Cinema History. Black Jack quickly loses interest and rides away.

When Johnny arrives in Santa Carolina, he comes to the local bar, where a rowdy brawl soon begins. This is an everyday occurrence, as it is how Harry, the owner of the bar, makes a living by making a few hundred a day from damage. Johnny befriends a cowboy named Billy upon entering, and, while watching the dancers, completely falls in love with one named Diana. Billy laughs at him and warns him that "the heart of Miss [Diana] Little is locked tighter than Fort Knox". When Johnny stands up and asks the crowd if anyone has a white sheet, it is but Diana who is in possession of one. What happens next shocks everyone including Diana. Johnny, in all his gentlemanly ways, comes up to Diana, and respectfully kisses her hand. To a girl used to nothing like that, Diana is so pleasantly appalled that she adds that she has two white sheets, and both of them belong to Johnny.

It all goes downhill from there. When Johnny shows his movies, with the gentlemen who take ladies for walks and tip their hats and say "please" and "thank you", the unruly cowboys begin to change their ways. The only two who do not benefit from this are Harry, who has lost significant profit, and the local pastor, who wants Diana to love him. The latter is in a much worse position, for since Johnny had begun doting on Diana, being the first man in her life to bring her flowers or treat her like a lady in any way, she had completely fallen in love with him and said that her heart will always belong to him.

Although Harry does everything he can, from burning the shed where the films are, to asking Black Jack to murder Johnny, to stealing the white sheet on which the movies were shown, it all seems to slide off the cinematographer's back, until he leaves to find a wedding gift for his beloved Diana. When he returns, he finds all the cowboys reverted to their old ways, due to the coming of Mr. Second, who is also a cinematographer, who shows the cowboys movies with violence (similar to what was later named "splatter film").

Johnny, with a heavy heart, leaves for the prairie, as he is under the impression that even Diana has left him for the pastor. However, on the way there, he is met by Black Jack, who had seen Johnny's movies through the window and has changed his ways, and Diana, who had captured the pastor and put him at gunpoint and managed to escape. Johnny then leaves with them, determined to help more people see the beauty and new worlds which movies allow us to be in.

Cast
 Andrei Mironov as Johnny First
 Aleksandra Yakovleva as Ms. Diana Little (singing parts by Larisa Dolina)
 Nikolai Karachentsov as Billy King
 Oleg Tabakov as Harry McKew
 Mikhail Boyarsky as  Black   Jack
 Igor Kvasha as pastor Adams
 Lev Durov as coffin maker
 Semyon Farada as Mr. Thompson
 Galina Polskikh as Mrs. Thompson
 Natalya Krachkovskaya as Conchita
 Spartak Mishulin as chief of the Comanches
 Natalya Fateyeva as chief's wife
 Albert Filozov as Mr. Second
 Mikhail Svetin as pharmacist
 Leonid Yarmolnik as one-eyed cowboy Martin
 Borislav Brondukov as Danly, stray cowboy
 Yuriy Dumchev as White Feather, chief's son
 Oleg Anofriyev as pianist

References

External links

Notes 

1987 films
1987 in the Soviet Union
1980s Western (genre) comedy films
Films scored by Gennady Gladkov
Films shot in Crimea
Films set in the 1900s
Films set in a movie theatre
Mosfilm films
Ostern films
1980s Russian-language films
Soviet musical comedy films
Russian comedy films
1987 comedy films
Foreign films set in the United States